Elena Siegman is an American singer, guitarist, songwriter and video game producer from Los Angeles.  She moved to Boston, and is the former lead guitarist and one of the founders of an all-girl punk band named Vagiant, now known as Tijuana Sweetheart.  As of January 2012, she sings in the Boston-based rock band BrownBoot. (Metal Bands)

In 2006, Siegman worked with Guitar Hero developers Harmonix as the lead producer of Guitar Hero II. Also, in work for the video game developer Treyarch, she provided vocals for the soundtrack to the Nazi Zombies, or simply Zombies, game mode in the video games Call of Duty: World at War (2008), Call of Duty: Black Ops (2010), Call of Duty: Black Ops II (2012), Call of Duty: Black Ops III (2015), Call of Duty: Black Ops 4 (2018) and Call of Duty: Black Ops Cold War (2020). In 2011, her music was released on the Call of Duty: Black Ops - Zombies Soundtrack as part of the Rezurrection DLC pack, the fourth downloadable content pack for Call of Duty: Black Ops. Some remastered versions of songs from previous games and a new track from Call of Duty: Black Ops II were released in 2013 on the Call of Duty: Black Ops II Zombies - Origins Soundtrack along with the Origins map pack for Call of Duty: Black Ops II. The tracks featuring her vocals are (in chronological order): Lullaby of a Dead Man, The One and Beauty of Annihilation from Call of Duty: World at War and Call of Duty: Black Ops; 115, Abracadavre, Pareidolia and Coming Home from Call of Duty: Black Ops; Archangel from Call of Duty: Black Ops II; Dead Again and The Gift from Call of Duty: Black Ops III. All songs were written and produced by Kevin Sherwood, sound designer and composer at Treyarch. She also provided vocals both Lead and Backup for the jingles of items in the Zombies game mode called Juggernog Perk-a-Cola,Double Tap Perk-a-Cola ,Speed Cola Perk-a-Cola,Elemental Pop Perk-a-Cola.

On May 24, 2011, she released her debut solo album, The Mighty.

In 2014 she joined Bungie to work on the Destiny franchise as a producer.

References 

American women singers
People from Los Angeles
Living people
Year of birth missing (living people)
Alternative rock singers
Nu metal singers
Video game producers
21st-century American women